Savage Life 3  is the third studio album by American rapper Webbie. The album was released on November 15, 2011. The album debuted at number 17 on the US Billboard 200 with 30,000 copies sold in its first week.

Track listing

Charts

Weekly charts

Year-end charts

References

Webbie albums
2011 albums
Sequel albums